Frost resistance is the ability of plants to survive cold temperatures. Generally, land plants of the northern hemisphere have higher frost resistance than those of the southern hemisphere. An example of a frost resistant plant is Drimys winteri which is more frost-tolerant than naturally occurring conifers and vessel-bearing angiosperms such as the Nothofagus that can be found in its range in southern South America.

References

Agricultural economics
Plant physiology